Japan competed at the 2019 World Championships in Athletics in Doha, Qatar from 27 September to 6 October 2019. The country finished in 8th place in the medal table.

Medalists

Results
Key
Note–Ranks given for track events are within the athlete's heat only
Q = Qualified for the next round
q = Qualified for the next round as a fastest loser or, in field events, by position without achieving the qualifying target
NR = National record
N/A = Round not applicable for the event
Bye = Athlete not required to compete in round

Men

Track & road

Field

Combined - Decathlon

Women

Track & road

Field

Mixed

Track & road

References

Japan
World Championships in Athletics
2019